Liu Le (born 14 February 1989) is a Chinese footballer who currently plays for  Dalian Professional in the Chinese Super League. His twin elder brother Liu Huan is also a footballer.

Club career
Liu Le started his professional football career in 2009 when he was promoted to China League One side Anhui Jiufang. He moved to Tianjin Runyulong in January 2011 when Tianjin took over Anhui Jiufang and followed the club move to Shenyang as Shenyang Shenbei in July 2011. On 30 April 2011, he scored his first senior goal in a 1–1 away draw against Wuhan Zhongbo. Liu kept his regular starter position with his twin brother Liu Huan after the club moved to Shenyang and changed their name as Shenyang Zhongze. Liu joined amateur club Shenyang City in 2015 after Shenyang Zhongze's dissolution. He transferred to China League Two club Shenzhen Ledman in March 2017.

On 2 January 2018, Liu transferred to Chinese Super League side Chongqing Dangdai following the departure of his brother Liu Huan joining Beijing Sinobo Guoan from Chongqing. He would go on to make his debut in a league game for the club on 3 March 2018 against Beijing Renhe in a 1-0 victory. Liu established himself as regular within the team until the club was dissolved on 24 May 2022 due to financial difficulties. He would briefly join fourth tier club Dalian Huayi before returning to the top tier with Dalian Professional, where he made his debut for the club in a league game on 20 September 2022 against Hebei F.C. that ended in a 2-1 victory.

Career statistics
.

References

External links
 

1989 births
Living people
Chinese footballers
Association football defenders
Anhui Jiufang players
Chongqing Liangjiang Athletic F.C. players
Chinese Super League players
China League One players
China League Two players
Footballers from Beijing
Twin sportspeople
Chinese twins